Yu Ruiyuan (born September 13, 1991) is a Chinese chess player. Born in Guangdong, he was awarded the title Grandmaster by FIDE in 2012. In 2006, he played on board 2 for the bronze medal-winning Chinese team at the World Youth Under-16 Chess Olympiad. In 2015, Yu won the bronze medal at the 1st Asian University Chess Championship in Beijing.

References

External links

Yu Ruiyuan chess games at 365Chess.com

1991 births
Living people
Chess grandmasters
Chess players from Guangdong